In plants, the substomatal cavity is the cavity located immediately proximal to the stoma. It acts as a diffusion chamber connected with intercellular air spaces and allows rapid diffusion of carbon dioxide and other gases (such as plant pheromones) in and out of plant cells.

References
Graham LE, Graham JM, Wilcox LW (2006) Plant Biology (Second Edition). Pearsons Education, USA.

See also
Stoma
Transpiration stream

Plant cells
Plant anatomy